The Machine Gun Fire or Camp Williams Fire was a wildfire in Herriman, Utah in 2010 that burned several dwellings.  It was started by a mistake at a firing range by National Guard troops on a training exercise. 4,351 acres burned, approximately 1600 homes were evacuated, and 3 homes were destroyed.

Origin
Live fire 50 caliber machine gun training had been scheduled at Camp Williams for the afternoon of Sunday, 19 September 2010.  As is common in the area during the late summer, the east winds off of the Wasatch Mountains picked up in the afternoon. On the previous Thursday afternoon, the National Weather Service issued a Fire Weather Watch for Saturday and Sunday. On Friday afternoon, it upgraded the alert to a Red Flag Warning for the entire weekend. Despite the dry conditions and base protocols that interdicted live-fire training during Red Flag conditions, a unit of the Utah National Guard commenced the live-fire exercise, although no highly flammable tracer rounds were used. Shrapnel ignited the brush.  The Utah National Guard admitted full responsibility.

Suppression
After the fire was noted on the Camp Williams Machine Gun Firing Range, on Sunday afternoon, fire crews from the camp with the assistance of two Black Hawk helicopters attempted to put out the blaze, but were unsuccessful, and the fire, whipped by dry winds, burned northwestward across Oak Springs Hollow.  Camp Williams firefighters notified the Utah Unified Fire Authority who mobilized local fire agencies.  However the fire crossed Shep's Ridge, and continued on to burn some houses on the edge of Herriman.  The fire had burned over 4,351 acres and was fully contained by 24 September 2010.

The Federal Emergency Management Agency (FEMA) authorized the use of federal funds in paying the costs of fighting the fire. FEMA approved the Fire Management Assistance Grant under a statute which provides reimbursement of up to 75 percent of the state's qualifying fire fighting costs.

Evacuations continued into Tuesday September 21, 2010, although the number of homes under evacuation orders lessened to 450 homes. The same day, it was announced that the fire was 50 percent contained. Several residents were allowed back to their homes.

Notes

External links
 "Blaze Rage: Witness videos of 'Machine Gun' Fire in Herriman, Utah " YouTube video
 "Mandatory Evacuation Area - Camp Williams Fire - 20 September 2010" City of Herriman

History of Salt Lake County, Utah
Wildfires in Utah
2010 wildfires in the United States
2010 in Utah
Military in Utah